"Evelyn Woodhead Speed Reading Course" is a parody skit of the numerous speed reading courses available in the United States in the 1960s and 1970s written by Cheech and Chong that first appeared on the 1973 album Los Cochinos. The title refers to the Evelyn Wood course.
Introduced by Tommy Chong, the piece begins with the words delivered phonetically by Cheech Marin: 
 

The short spoken word testimonial style skit was an effective parody of commercials that were prevalent on television and radio stations in that era.

1973 short stories
Comic short stories